Marcinek may refer to:

Marcinek, Greater Poland Voivodeship, a place in Poland
Ewa Marcinek (fl. from 2020), Polish-Icelandic writer
Marcinek, a puppet theatre in Poznań, Poland, art director Leokadia Serafinowicz 1960–1980
Marcinek Award, of the Ale Kino! International Young Audience Film Festival

See also
 Martinek, a surname